Christopher Poulsen (born 11 September 1981) is a retired Danish professional footballer player who plays as defender and current manager of Lemming IF.

He previously played for Superliga clubs Silkeborg IF and FC Midtjylland.

Player career
Poulsen played one game for the Denmark national under-21 football team in November 2002. He was called up for the Denmark League XI national football team by national team manager Morten Olsen in January 2007, and took part in two unofficial national team games during the team's tour of the United States, El Salvador, and Honduras. He made his senior Denmark national football team debut in an August 2008 friendly match against Spain, coming on as a substitute. He started his second national team game in September 2008, and played the entire game as Denmark drew Hungary 0-0 in the 2010 FIFA World Cup qualification tournament.

On April 16, 2013 Silkeborg IF announced that they had terminated Christopher Poulsen's contract one year early due to "disagreements over nonsporting issues"  In June 2013, he rejoined his former club Viborg FF.

In July 2016, Poulsen retired from professional football, instead opting to continue as a player-assistant coach for Silkeborg KFUM competing in the Series 1, the sixth highest level of Danish football.

Managerial career
On 22 November 2018, Højslev St. IF, competing in the sixth highest division, announced that Poulsen had been appointed as their new head coach. He was sacked in January 2020.

In July 2020 it was confirmed, that Poulsen had signed as a playing assistant coach with Danish amateur club Bording IF, under his former Silkeborg KFUM-manager, Lars Dahl. In March 2022, Poulsen was appointed manager of Jutland Series club Lemming IF.

References

Christopher P. stopper i Viborg, bold.dk, 3 May 2016

External links
Danish national team profile
Career statistics by Danmarks Radio
Danish Superliga statistics
Haslund profile

1981 births
Living people
Danish men's footballers
Denmark international footballers
Denmark under-21 international footballers
Vendsyssel FF players
Silkeborg IF players
Silkeborg KFUM players
Viborg FF players
FC Midtjylland players
Danish Superliga players
Association football midfielders
Danish football managers
People from Hjørring
Sportspeople from the North Jutland Region